The Minister of Finance of Austria heads the Ministry of Finance.

Ministers

First Republic

Second Republic

See also 
 Ministry of Finance (Austria)

Notes

References 

Finance